Shukhov refers to:

 Boris Shukhov (*8 May 1947), a retired Soviet cyclist
 Vladimir Shukhov (1853–1939), a Russian engineer-polymath, scientist and architect. 

Various structures in Russia and an industrial process bear his name: 
Structures:
 Shukhov Tower, Moscow
 Shukhov Rotunda
 Shukhov tower on the Oka River, Nizhny Novgorod
Industrial process:
 Shukhov cracking process